= Blantons, Virginia =

Unincorporated community in Virginia, United States

Coordinates: 38°03′09″N 77°33′40″W

Blantons is an unincorporated community in Caroline County, in the U.S. state of Virginia.
